In Norse mythology, Veðrfölnir (Old Norse "storm pale," "wind bleached", or "wind-witherer") is a hawk sitting between the eyes of an unnamed eagle that is perched on top of the world tree Yggdrasil. Veðrfölnir is sometimes modernly anglicized as Vedrfolnir, Vedurfolnir or Vetrfolnir.

The unnamed eagle is attested in both the Poetic Edda, compiled in the 13th century from earlier traditional sources, and the Prose Edda, written in the 13th century by Snorri Sturluson, while Veðrfölnir is solely attested in the Prose Edda. In both the Poetic Edda and the Prose Edda, the squirrel Ratatoskr carries messages between the unnamed eagle and Nidhöggr, the worm that resides below the world tree. Scholars have proposed theories about the implications of the birds.

Attestations

In the Poetic Edda poem Grímnismál, the god Odin (disguised as Grimnir) says that:

The eagle is again attested in chapter 16 of the Prose Edda book Gylfaginning, yet here with the company of Veðrfölnir. In the chapter, Gangleri (described as king Gylfi in disguise) asks the enthroned figure of High what other notable facts there are to know about Yggdrasil. High responds (Veðrfölnir is here anglicized as Vedrfolnir):
'There is much to be told. An eagle sits at the top of the ash, and it has knowledge of many things. Between its eyes sits the hawk called Vedrfolnir [...]. The squirrel called Ratatosk runs up and down the ash. He tells slanderous gossip, provoking the eagle and Nidhogg.'

Theories
John Lindow points out that Snorri does not say why a hawk should be sitting between the eyes of an eagle or what role it may play. Lindow theorizes that "presumably the hawk is associated with the wisdom of the eagle" and that "perhaps, like Odin's ravens, it flies off acquiring and bringing back knowledge".

Hilda Ellis Davidson says that the notion of an eagle atop a tree and Nídhöggr coiled around the roots of the tree has parallels in other cosmologies from Asia, and that Norse cosmology may have been influenced by these Asiatic cosmologies from a northern route. On the other hand, Davidson adds, some Germanic peoples are attested as worshipping their deities in open forest clearings, and that a sky god was particularly connected with the oak tree, and therefore "a central tree was a natural symbol for them also".

See also
 Hræsvelgr, a jötunn in the form of an eagle
 Víðópnir, the rooster that sits atop the tree Mímameiðr

Notes

References

 Bellows, Henry Adams (Trans.) (1936). The Poetic Edda. Princeton University Press. New York: The American-Scandinavian Foundation.
 Byock, Jesse (Trans.) (2005). The Prose Edda. Penguin Classics. 
 Davidson, Hilda Ellis (1993). The Lost Beliefs of Northern Europe. Routledge. 
 Lindow, John (2001). Norse Mythology: A Guide to the Gods, Heroes, Rituals, and Beliefs. Oxford University Press. 
 Orchard, Andy (1997). Dictionary of Norse Myth and Legend. Cassell. 
 Thorpe, Benjamin (Trans.) (1907). The Elder Edda of Saemund Sigfusson. Norrœna Society.

Birds in Norse mythology
Mythological birds of prey